Jacobus Albertus Kriel (born 21 August 1989 in Standerton, South Africa) is a rugby union player for . He plays as a flanker.

Kriel has also represented the University of Johannesburg in the Varsity Cup.

He was the headboy of Hoërskool Standerton and captained their first team, he also played Craven Week.

Career
On 28 May 2016, Kriel was included in a 31-man  squad for their three-test match series against a touring  team.

Kriel was a part of the Springbok team that defeated France 3-0 in the mid-year test series in 2017. Following this series, Kriel took over as captain of the Lions for the rest of the 2017 Super Rugby season after regular captain Warren Whiteley was injured during the test series against the French.

Kriel was ruled out for the rest of 2017 following a shoulder injury at training prior to the first test against New Zealand.

On 30 April 2018, it was announced that Kriel had been released from his contract with the Lions to join up with former coach Johan Ackermann at Gloucester Rugby.

The Lions announced 3 February 2020 that Kriel had rejoined the club on a three-year deal.

References

External links

Lions profile
itsrugby.co.uk Profile

1989 births
Living people
South African rugby union players
Golden Lions players
Lions (United Rugby Championship) players
Rugby union flankers
Afrikaner people
University of Johannesburg alumni
Kubota Spears Funabashi Tokyo Bay players
South African expatriate rugby union players
Expatriate rugby union players in Japan
South African expatriate sportspeople in Japan
South Africa international rugby union players
Gloucester Rugby players
Rugby union players from Mpumalanga